"Adrift" is the second episode of the first season of the American fantasy television series The Lord of the Rings: The Rings of Power, based on the novel The Lord of the Rings and its appendices by J. R. R. Tolkien. Set in the Second Age of Middle-earth, thousands of years before Tolkien's The Hobbit and The Lord of the Rings, it follows a large cast of characters facing great change in their lives. The episode was written by Gennifer Hutchison and directed by J. A. Bayona.

Amazon made a multi-season commitment for a new The Lord of the Rings series in November 2017. J. D. Payne and Patrick McKay were set to develop it in July 2018, and Bayona was hired to direct the first two episodes a year later. Filming for the first season began in New Zealand in February 2020, but was placed on hold in March due to the COVID-19 pandemic. Production resumed in September and wrapped for the first two episodes by the end of December. The second episode introduces the Dwarven kingdom of Khazad-dûm, including one of the most complicated sequences of the season to film: a rock-breaking contest between the Dwarf Durin IV (Owain Arthur) and the Elf Elrond (Robert Aramayo). Filming for the Sundering Seas sequences took place in two large water tanks, and Olympic swimmer Trent Bray taught the actors how to swim.

"Adrift" premiered on the streaming service Amazon Prime Video on September 1, 2022. Along with the first episode it had the most viewers of any Prime Video premiere within 24 hours, and received generally positive reviews.

Plot 
Nori Brandyfoot and Poppy Proudfellow investigate the strange man inside the meteor crater and are surprised to find him alive, surrounded by cold fire. They struggle to move him away from the crater and into a makeshift shelter. The next day, Nori gives him food and realizes that he does not speak their language as he attempts to communicate something to them. Nori and Poppy later find the stranger looking at the stars. He uses magic to break open Poppy's lantern of fireflies and arrange them into a constellation that Nori does not recognize. She believes that they can help him by finding that constellation. When the stranger stops using the magic, the fireflies all die.

In the ruins of Hordern, Arondir and Bronwyn find no survivors or bodies. They discover a tunnel below one of the houses and Arondir enters to discover where it came from. Bronwyn returns to Tirharad to warn the other villagers, but they dismiss her. In the tunnel, Arondir is captured by unknown creatures. Bronwyn returns home and finds Theo hiding from an Orc that has burst from beneath their floor-boards. Bronwyn and Theo kill the orc and use its head to convince the other villagers to flee the town for the near-by tower of the Elven watchers. Theo brings the broken sword, which appears to draw power from a bleeding wound on Theo's wrist.

Elrond and Celebrimbor discuss the latter's new project in Eregion, the realm of the Elven-smiths. Celebrimbor is planning to build a forge capable of creating powerful objects, and requires a workforce that High King Gil-galad is unable to provide. Elrond suggests they look to the Dwarves for help, and they travel to Khazad-dûm to meet with his old friend Prince Durin IV. Elrond is surprised to find that he is not welcome there, and invokes the rite of sigin-tarâg, a rock-breaking contest between himself and Durin.

Elrond loses the contest, which means he is to be banished from all Dwarven lands. As Durin escorts him out, Elrond learns that he is not welcome because he has not visited in 20 years. Durin is offended that Elrond missed his wedding and the birth of his children. Elrond apologizes to Durin and his wife Disa, who encourages the pair to make up. Durin agrees to hear Elrond's proposal, which he later relays to King Durin III. The latter is concerned that Elrond's arrival relates to a new discovery that the Dwarves have made.

Swimming back to Middle-earth, Galadriel encounters a raft of stranded humans escaping from a sea creature that destroyed their ship. The creature attacks the raft, leaving only Galadriel and one of the Men alive. He introduces himself as Halbrand of the Southlands, and explains that he is escaping from Orcs who have attacked his homeland. They are caught in a storm and Halbrand saves Galadriel from drowning. The next morning, the pair are found by an unknown ship.

Production

Development 
Amazon acquired the global television rights for J. R. R. Tolkien's The Lord of the Rings in November 2017. The company's streaming service, Amazon Prime Video, gave a multi-season commitment to a series based on the novel and its appendices, to be produced by Amazon Studios. It was later titled The Lord of the Rings: The Rings of Power. Amazon hired J. D. Payne and Patrick McKay to develop the series and serve as showrunners in July 2018, and J. A. Bayona was hired to direct the first two episodes a year later. Gennifer Hutchison had joined the series as a writer by then. The series is set in the Second Age of Middle-earth, thousands of years before the events of Tolkien's The Hobbit and The Lord of the Rings, and the first season focuses on introducing the setting and major heroic characters to the audience. Hutchison wrote the second episode which is titled "Adrift".

Writing 
The showrunners wanted each group of characters to be introduced at "a time of enormous change in their worlds" to help make the series "dramatic and surprising", such as the Dwarves who "are in the middle of a great change in their society. And the arrival of an Elf is sort of upending the way the established order is there." That Elf is Elrond, who is not welcome in the kingdom of Khazad-dûm due to having not visited in 20 years. Elrond invokes "the rite of sigin-tarâg", a rock-breaking contest between himself and Prince Durin IV, which Durin wins. Elrond is banished from Khazad-dûm, but Durin soon goes against this and allows Elrond to stay and meet his family. Durin actor Owain Arthur felt that this showed how deep the friendship is between the pair. He also felt it was a "true Durin trait" that the character remained angry because he was angry with himself for forgiving Elrond.

The episode further explores the stranger who falls from the sky at the end of the first episode and now interacts with the Harfoots Nori Brandyfoot and Poppy Proudfellow. McKay compared the stranger to the titular characters of E.T. the Extra-Terrestrial (1982) and The Iron Giant (1999), being a mysterious character who talks in an unknown language and could be there "for good or ill". The showrunners took inspiration from the films of Buster Keaton and other silent films for the character, and gave actor Daniel Weyman "theater exercises" during his audition to see how he could communicate emotions without dialogue.

Casting 

The series' large cast includes Robert Aramayo as Elrond, Owain Arthur as Durin IV, Nazanin Boniadi as Bronwyn, Morfydd Clark as Galadriel, Ismael Cruz Córdova as Arondir, Charles Edwards as Celebrimbor, Lenny Henry as Sadoc Burrows, Markella Kavenagh as Elanor "Nori" Brandyfoot, Tyroe Muhafidin as Theo, Sophia Nomvete as Disa, Megan Richards as Poppy Proudfellow, Dylan Smith as Largo Brandyfoot, Charlie Vickers as Halbrand, Daniel Weyman as the stranger, and Sara Zwangobani as Marigold Brandyfoot. Also starring are Thusitha Jayasundera as Malva, Maxine Cunliffe as Vilma, Berynn Schwerdt as Eamon, Virginie Laverdure as Abigail, Jane Montgomery Griffiths as Astrid, Geoff Morrell as Waldreg, Peter Tait as Tredwill, and Peter Mullan as Durin III.

Filming 
Amazon confirmed in September 2019 that filming for the first season would take place in New Zealand, where the Lord of the Rings and Hobbit film trilogies were made. Filming began in early February, primarily at Kumeu Film Studios and Auckland Film Studios in Auckland, under the working title Untitled Amazon Project or simply UAP. Óscar Faura was the director of photography for the first two episodes, after serving the same role on all of Bayona's previous films. Location filming took place around Auckland in February. Filming for the first two episodes was expected to continue through May, but was placed on hold in mid-March 2020 due to the COVID-19 pandemic. The majority of filming for the first two episodes was reportedly completed by then. Filming resumed on September 28, and Bayona completed filming for his episodes by December 23.

The sequence where Galadriel and Halbrand are trapped in the Sundering Seas during a storm took three to four weeks of preparation, including weeks of training for Clark and Vickers with Olympic swimmer Trent Bray to learn how to "properly swim", free dive, and hold their breath for minutes at a time. Several diggers were used to create waves in the outdoor tank, which was covered by a retractable roof that Bayona and Faura requested based on a similar set-up that they used on the film The Impossible (2012). The tank was big enough that some shots required no or minimal additions from the visual effects team. The raft that Galadriel and Halbrand are on was controlled by a gimbal to prevent it from drifting during filming. Another sequence in the episode, in which the characters are attacked by a sea creature, was mostly filmed in the smaller dive tank.

Different techniques were used to make the Dwarf and Harfoot actors appear smaller than the rest of the cast, including oversized props and prosthetics, and actors looking over the heads of their scene partners. Visual effects producer Ron Ames said they tried to have the cast members looking at each other whenever possible to prioritize the performances. Executive producer Lindsey Weber said the technical requirements of this scale difference made the rock-breaking competition between Elrond and Durin one of the most complicated sequences in the season to create. It took three days to film, using repeated camera movements to capture each shot multiple times with the different actors filmed at the correct scale. Bayona was initially concerned about using motion control photography to create repeated camera movements because he felt this approach usually created "rigid" shots that were noticeable to audiences. He asked the visual effects team if they could use hand-held cameras for motion control shots, and the team developed a system that would replicate the movement of a hand-held shot.

Visual effects 
Visual effects for the episode were created by Industrial Light & Magic (ILM), Wētā FX, Method Studios, Rodeo FX, Rising Sun Pictures, Cause and FX, Atomic Arts, and Cantina Creative. The different vendors were overseen by visual effects supervisor Jason Smith. Rodeo added digital movements to the snails that Nori and the stranger eat, as the on-set props were made of chocolate and candy.

ILM worked on the Sundering Seas sequence, combining aerial photography from New Zealand's coastline and oceans with footage from the on-set water tanks. The vendor also provided additional water effects and waves that could not be captured in the tanks, due to their size or because of actor safety, creating "terrifying and violently strong" waves. Ames said the result was "50/50" in terms of how much water in the shots was practical versus digital. The company also created the sea creature that attacks the characters. Smith felt the sequence was successful because of ILM's experienced artists and existing tools for water simulations.

Music 

A soundtrack album featuring composer Bear McCreary's score for the episode was released on Amazon Music on August 31, 2022. It was quickly removed and then made available again on September 2. McCreary said the album contained "virtually every second of score" from the episode. It was added to other music streaming services after the full first season was released. All music composed by Bear McCreary:

Release 
"Adrift" premiered on Prime Video in the United States on September 1, 2022. It was released at the same time around the world, in more than 240 countries and territories.

Reception

Viewership 
Amazon announced that The Rings of Power had been watched by 25 million viewers globally in the first 24 hours that the first two episodes were available on Prime Video. The company stated that this was the biggest premiere ever for the service. It did not specify how much of an episode a user needed to watch to count as a viewer. Analytics company Samba TV, which gathers viewership data from certain Smart TVs and content providers, reported that 1.3 million U.S. households watched the second episode within four days of its release. Whip Media, who track viewership data for the 21 million worldwide users of their TV Time app, calculated that for the week ending September 4, three days after the episode's debut, it was the second-highest original streaming series for U.S. viewership. Nielsen Media Research, who record streaming viewership on U.S. television screens, estimated that The Rings of Power was watched for 1.25 billion minutes during its first four days. This is around 12.6 million viewers, the most for any streaming series or film for the week ending September 4.

Critical response 

The review aggregator website Rotten Tomatoes reported an 85% approval rating with an average score of 7.4/10 based on 149 reviews. The website's critics consensus reads: "'Adrift' belies its title and gives The Rings of Power some narrative shape, propelling its adventures forward in intriguing directions while treating fans to a tour of Khazad-dûm in all its glory."

Accolades 
The episode received two nominations at the 21st Visual Effects Society Awards: Outstanding Created Environment in an Episode, Commercial, or Real-Time Project for Khazud Dûm (attributed to James Ogle, Péter Bujdosó, Lon Krung, and Shweta Bhatnagar), and Outstanding Special (Practical) Effects in a Photoreal or Animated Project for the storm sequence (attributed to Dean Clarke, Oliver Gee, Eliot Naimie, and Mark Robson).

Companion media 
An episode of the official aftershow Deadline's Inside the Ring: LOTR: The Rings of Power for "Adrift" was released on September 3, 2022. Hosted by Deadline Hollywood Dominic Patten and Anthony D'Alessandro, it features exclusive "footage and insights" for the episode, plus interviews with cast members Nomvette, Arthur, Kavenagh, Richards, Weyman, Zwangobani, and Aramayo, as well as executive producers McKay, Payne, and Weber. On October 14, The Official The Lord of the Rings: The Rings of Power Podcast was released on Amazon Music. Hosted by actress Felicia Day, the second episode is dedicated to "Adrift" and features Kavenagh, Payne, and McKay. On November 21, a bonus segment featuring behind-the-scenes footage from the episode was added to Prime Video's X-Ray feature as part of a series titled "The Making of The Rings of Power".

References

External links 
 

2022 American television episodes
The Lord of the Rings: The Rings of Power